Kinshasa Airport may refer to:

N'djili Airport, the main airport of Kinshasa
N'Dolo Airport, a secondary airport of Kinshasa, used for domestic flights